Mikolaj Dembowski (d. 1757) was a Catholic bishop in Kamianets-Podilskyi, who, under the influence of Jacob Frank, ordered the burning of all copies of the Talmud, possibly up to a thousand. It is said that he died during the events, after three days of celebration, and that a plague broke out; the local priests dug up his body and cut off the head, but the plague did not end until his body was burned in the same place where the sacred books had been burned.

References

1757 deaths